Orthomegas frischeiseni is a species of beetle in the family Cerambycidae. It is found in Peru, Bolivia and Brazil.

References

Beetles described in 1998
Prioninae